This is a partial list of people who have spoken or otherwise presented at official TED conferences such as TED, TED@, TEDActive, TEDCity, TED-Ed, TED-NY, TEDGlobal, TEDSummit, TEDIndia, TEDSalon, TEDWomen, TEDYouth, TED Fellows Retreat, and TED Talks Education. It also includes speakers at the independent TEDMED conferences. Talks from the independent TEDx conferences are not included since there are thousands of such events (over 11,000 held and over 1,100 upcoming ) making them less notable. The TED.com website also hosts videos from conferences not affiliated with TED, but those talks and speakers are not included in this list.

A

B

C

D

E

F

G

H

I

J

K

L

M

N

O

P

Q

R

S

T

U

V

W

Y

Z

See also 
 TED Prize

References

External links 
 

Speakers